Pré-en-Pail-Saint-Samson is a commune in the department of Mayenne, western France. The municipality was established on 1 January 2016 by merger of the former communes of Pré-en-Pail and Saint-Samson.

References

See also 
Communes of the Mayenne department

Communes of Mayenne
Populated places established in 2016
2016 establishments in France